Deh Now (also Romanized as Deh Now and Deh Nau) is a village in Zhan Rural District, in the Central District of Dorud County, Lorestan Province, Iran. At the 2006 census, its population was 1,521, in 341 families.

References 

Towns and villages in Dorud County